Brian Wellman (born September 8, 1967) is a former triple jumper from Bermuda, who became indoor world champion in 1995, setting a new championship record (CR) of 17.72. His personal best outdoors was 17.62 metres. Both these marks are Bermudian records. In addition, he has a wind-assisted (+7.1 m/s) mark of 17.75 metres.

Wellman competed collegiately for the University of Arkansas where he won two NCAA Outdoor triple jump titles.

Achievements

World rankings

Wellman was ranked among the top ten triple jumpers in the world by Track and Field News on seven occasions:

References

External links

Bernews: Brian Wellman Bio, Photos and Videos

1967 births
Living people
Bermudian triple jumpers
Athletes (track and field) at the 1988 Summer Olympics
Athletes (track and field) at the 1992 Summer Olympics
Athletes (track and field) at the 1996 Summer Olympics
Athletes (track and field) at the 2000 Summer Olympics
Athletes (track and field) at the 1991 Pan American Games
Athletes (track and field) at the 1999 Pan American Games
Athletes (track and field) at the 2003 Pan American Games
Olympic athletes of Bermuda
University of Arkansas people
Arkansas Razorbacks men's track and field athletes
Athletes (track and field) at the 1990 Commonwealth Games
Athletes (track and field) at the 1994 Commonwealth Games
Athletes (track and field) at the 2002 Commonwealth Games
Pan American Games competitors for Bermuda
World Athletics Championships medalists
World Athletics Championships athletes for Bermuda
Commonwealth Games bronze medallists for Bermuda
Commonwealth Games medallists in athletics
Universiade medalists in athletics (track and field)
Universiade medalists for Bermuda
World Athletics Indoor Championships winners
Medalists at the 1991 Summer Universiade
Medallists at the 1994 Commonwealth Games